Heston Marc Blumenthal   (born 27 May 1966) is a British celebrity chef, TV personality and food writer. Blumenthal is regarded as a pioneer of multi-sensory cooking, food pairing and flavour encapsulation. He came to public attention with unusual recipes, such as bacon-and-egg ice cream and snail porridge. His recipes for triple-cooked chips and soft-centred Scotch eggs have been widely imitated. He has advocated a scientific approach to cooking, for which he has been awarded honorary degrees from Reading, Bristol and London universities and made an honorary Fellow of the Royal Society of Chemistry. 

Blumenthal's public profile has been increased by a number of television series, most notably for Channel 4, as well as a product range for the Waitrose supermarket chain introduced in 2010. He is the proprietor of the Fat Duck in Bray, Berkshire, a three-Michelin-star restaurant which is widely regarded as one of the best in the world. Blumenthal also owns Dinner, a two-Michelin-star restaurant in London, and a pub in Bray, the Hind's Head, with one Michelin star.

Early life 
Heston Marc Blumenthal was born in Shepherd's Bush, London, on 27 May 1966, to a Jewish father born in Southern Rhodesia and an English mother who converted to Judaism. His surname comes from a great-grandfather from Latvia and means 'flowered valley' (or 'bloom-dale'), in German.

Blumenthal was raised in Paddington, and attended Latymer Upper School in Hammersmith; St John's Church of England School in Lacey Green, Buckinghamshire; and John Hampden Grammar School, High Wycombe.

His interest in cooking began at the age of sixteen on a family holiday to Provence, France, when he was taken to the 3-Michelin-starred restaurant L'Oustau de Baumanière. He was inspired by the quality of the food and "the whole multi-sensory experience: the sound of fountains and cicadas, the heady smell of lavender, the sight of the waiters carving lamb at the table". When he learned to cook, he was influenced by the cookbook series Les recettes originales, with French chefs such as Alain Chapel.

When he left school at eighteen, Blumenthal began an apprenticeship at Raymond Blanc's Le Manoir aux Quat' Saisons but left after a week's probation. Over the next ten years he worked in a "relatively undemanding series of jobs – credit controller, repo man" during the day, teaching himself the French classical repertoire in the evenings. A pivotal moment came when reading On Food and Cooking: the Science and Lore of the Kitchen by Harold McGee in the mid-1980s. This challenged kitchen practices such as searing meat to seal in the juices, and it encouraged Heston to "adopt a totally different attitude towards cuisine that at its most basic boiled down to: question everything".

Career

In 1995, Blumenthal bought a run-down pub in Bray, Berkshire called the Ringers and re-opened it as the Fat Duck. It quickly gained the attention of food critics; Matthew Fort and Fay Maschler praised the cooking. Blumenthal described the original restaurant as a "bistro".

Blumenthal acquired the Hind's Head, also in Bray, in 2004. The building was a 15th-century tavern; it now serves traditional seasonal cuisine and historic British dishes. In 2011, it was named the Michelin Pub Guide's "Pub of the Year".

In January 2011, Blumenthal opened his first restaurant outside Bray, Dinner by Heston Blumenthal, at the Mandarin Oriental Hyde Park, London. Historians helped to develop the restaurant's dishes from historic British recipes.  Dinner was awarded its first Michelin star in 2012. It was voted the 7th best restaurant in the world in 2013. It received a second Michelin Star in the 2014 Michelin Guide.

In June 2014, Blumenthal announced a new restaurant, the Perfectionists' Cafe, in Heathrow Airport.

The Fat Duck was temporarily relocated to Melbourne, Australia in 2015 whilst the Bray restaurant was refurbished. Upon reaching the end of its temporary opening, the restaurant became a permanent Melbourne-based Dinner by Heston Blumenthal although not owned by him.

Television 
In 2002, Heston made a series of six half-hour television programmes, Kitchen Chemistry with Heston Blumenthal, which was transmitted on Discovery Science along with a book Kitchen Chemistry, published by the Royal Society of Chemistry.  They have recently been repeated on the Community Channel.

During 200407, he presented two BBC series called Heston Blumenthal: In Search of Perfection and Heston Blumenthal: Further Adventures In Search of Perfection.

Blumenthal moved from the BBC to Channel 4 in March 2008, joining the channel's group of celebrity chefs which already included Jamie Oliver, Hugh Fearnley-Whittingstall and Gordon Ramsay. In January 2009 a three-part series of television programmes on Channel 4 covered his efforts to revamp the menu at a Little Chef motorway restaurant on the A303 road at Popham. The Little Chef group extended Blumenthal's menu to 12 branches but, in 2013, removed his dishes from all restaurants.

In March 2009 Blumenthal began a short series of programmes, called Heston's Feasts, showing themed dinner banquets. A second series of this was commissioned and began in 2010.

From 22 February 2011, Channel 4 began airing Heston's new show, titled Heston's Mission Impossible, in which Heston targets lacklustre food served in various industries and aims to upgrade the food to meals that people enjoy to eat.

In January 2012, How To Cook Like Heston, aired on Channel 4. The programme was aimed at home cooks and featured some of the more approachable techniques employed by Blumenthal.

In November 2012, Blumenthal fronted a television programme for Channel 4 entitled Heston's Fantastical Food and has also been part of a new 2014 series of Heston's Great British Food, again commissioned by Channel 4.

In 2020, Blumenthal appeared as a judge in the Channel 4 series 'Crazy Delicious' hosted by British comedian and TV presenter Jayde Adams, alongside chefs Niklas Ekstedt and Carla Hall.

In 2021, he participated as a judge in the French version of Top Chef, proposing a food pairing test.

In July 2022, Blumenthal appeared as a guest judge on the final episode of the Australian version of Masterchef.

Cooking methods

He has experimented with foodpairing, in which recipes are created by identifying molecular similarities between different ingredients and bringing these together in a dish. One of the first such was Blumenthal's white chocolate with caviar. He created unusual combinations, including Roast Foie Gras "Benzaldehyde" and salmon poached in a liquorice gel accompanied by asparagus. While many of these unexpected combinations have been critically well received, Blumenthal himself has pointed out the limitations of such an approach, insisting that although foodpairing is a good tool for creativity, it is still no substitute for the chef's culinary intuition. ‘The molecular profile of a single ingredient is so complex that even if it has several compounds in common with another, there are still as many reasons why they won't work together as reasons why they will.’

Statement on the "new cookery" 
From the late 1990s, scientific understanding, precision and technology became characteristic of modern cuisine, in so-called "molecular gastronomy". On 10 December 2006 Blumenthal and Harold McGee published a "Statement on the 'New Cookery'" in the Observer to summarise the tenets of this cuisine. In it they emphasise that openness to novel techniques and ingredients can be used as a means to achieve excellent dishes, but they value tradition. Novel techniques and ingredients should only be used when they contribute to a dish. For example, liquid nitrogen should not be used for the sake of novelty. And that progress can come from collaboration, for example with chemists and psychologists.

Multi-sensory cooking
Blumenthal calls his scientific approach to cuisine "multi-sensory cooking", arguing that eating is "one of the few activities we do that involves all of the senses simultaneously". One of the catalysts for this culinary approach was a visit at 16 to the restaurant L'Oustau de Baumanière in Provence, which at the time had three Michelin stars. The trip prompted a passion for cooking, above all because of "the whole multisensory experience: the sound of fountains and cicadas, the heady smell of lavender, the sight of the waiters carving lamb at the table". One of the other main inspirations for a multi-sensory style of cooking was the lack of space and opulence at the Fat Duck. "Places like the Baumaniere had a view and a history and architecture that took its diners to a world of beauty and indulgence. The Fat Duck didn't have any of that, so it had had to capture the diners’ imagination in a different way – taking them to the mysteries of flavour perception and multi sensory delight."

The event that cemented Heston's interest in this area was his creation of a crab ice cream to accompany a crab risotto. "People had difficulty accepting Crab Ice Cream, yet if it was renamed "Frozen Crab Bisque", people found it more acceptable and less sweet. p. 71 The phenomenon was subsequently researched by Martin Yeomans and Lucy Chambers of the University of Sussex, who served test subjects a version of Blumenthal's ice cream flavoured with smoked salmon, but told one group they would be tasting ice cream and the other that they would be tasting a frozen savoury mousse. Although all consumed identical food, those eating what they thought was savoury mousse found the flavour acceptable while those eating what they thought was ice cream found the taste salty and generally disgusting. For Blumenthal, this confirmed his ideas. "If something as simple as a name could make a dish appear more or less salty ... what effect might other cues have on flavours and our appreciation of them?"

Since that point, exploring the sensory potential of food – via both research and the creation of new dishes – has been an ongoing and characteristic strand of Heston's cooking.  In 2004, working on a commission for the photographer Nick Knight, he created a Delice of Chocolate containing popping candy and took the imaginative step of arranging for diners to listen on headphones to the little explosions it made as they ate – the first time such a thing had been done. With Professor Charles Spence, head of the Crossmodal Research Laboratory at Oxford University he has conducted several experiments into how our sense of sound can affect perception of flavour. In one experiment, test subjects consumed an oyster in two-halves: the first half was accompanied by maritime sounds, the second by farmyard sounds, and they were then asked to rate pleasantness and intensity of flavour. It was found that oysters eaten while listening to seaside sounds were considered significantly more pleasant. In another, similar experiment, test subjects tasted bacon-and-egg ice cream while listening to sounds of bacon sizzling, followed by tasting it while listening to the sound of chickens clucking. The sizzling bacon sound made the bacon flavour appear more intense.

In Blumenthal's view, experiments such as these show that our appreciation of food is subjective, determined by information sent by the senses to the brain: "the ways in which we make sense of what we are eating and decide whether we like it or not depend to a large extent on memory and contrast. Memory provides us with a range of references – flavours, tastes, smells, sights, sounds, emotions – that we draw on continually as we eat." His dishes, therefore, tend to be designed to appeal to the senses in concert, and through this to trigger memories, associations and emotions. Thus the Nitro-poached Green Tea and Lime Mousse on the Fat Duck menu is served with spritz of ‘lime grove’ scent from an atomiser; and the Jelly of Quail dish includes among its tableware a bed of oak moss, as well as being accompanied by a specially created scent of oak moss that is dispersed at the table by means of dry ice.

The most complete expression to date of his multisensory philosophy, however, is probably the dish ‘Sound of the Sea’, which first appeared on the Fat Duck menu in 2007. In this, ingredients with a distinctly oceanic character and flavour – dried kelp, hijiki seaweed, baby eels, razor clams, cockles, mussels, sea urchins – are fashioned into a course that has the appearance of the shore's edge, complete with sea ‘spume’ and edible sand. It is served on a glass-topped box containing real sand, and accompanied by headphones relaying the sounds of seagulls and the sea by means of a small iPod (placed in a conch shell) and earphones. The idea, according to Blumenthal, was one ‘of creating a world, of transporting the diner – through sound, through food, through an integrated appeal to the senses – to another place’.

Signature dishes

Blumenthal's most famous signature dishes include triple-cooked chips, snail porridge, bacon-and-egg ice cream and parsnip cereal, mock turtle soup (which combines a multi-sensory experience with historical references), Meat Fruit, and his Sweet Shop petit fours.

He has pioneered the use of sound as part of the dining experience with his Sound of the Sea dish where diners listen to a recording of the seaside – crashing waves with occasional sounds of distant seagulls, children's laughter and the horn of a ship, while they eat a dish of king fish, konbu cured halibut, ballotine of mackerel with 5 different seaweeds, sea jelly beans and monks beard served on "sand" made from tapioca starch, toasted Japanese breadcrumbs, miso paste and dried seaweeds.

Blumenthal is also known for his use of scented dry ice. Blumenthal and his restaurant "The Fat Duck" have been credited as instigators of the bacon dessert "craze". He was preparing sweet and savoury bacon-and-egg ice cream as early as 2004, and news "about the intriguingly odd confection quickly spread through the food world."

Historic influences 
Blumenthal uses British history in his dishes. He became interested in historical cooking in the late 1990s upon obtaining a copy of The Vivendier, a translation of a fifteenth-century cookery manuscript that contained unusual recipes, such as a chicken that appears roasted but wakes up as it is served. He said "I'd had little idea the cooking of the past could be so playful, audacious and creative."

Following this, he attended an Oxford Symposium of Food and Cookery where he met the food historians Richard Fitch, who works for Historic Royal Palaces and Marc Meltonville. Later he met a third food historian, Ivan Day and, in consultation with these three, began developing dishes inspired by recipes in historical British cookbooks. The first completed dish based on a historic recipe was Quaking Pudding, which is now on the menu at the Hinds Head. This was followed by Beef Royal and Chocolate Wine, which featured on the Fat Duck menu. The opening of Dinner by Heston Blumenthal presented him with far greater scope for historical cooking, and its menu is composed solely of dishes inspired by the recipes of the past. His 2013 book Historic Heston is a collection of historical recipes that have appeared on the menus of Dinner by Heston Blumenthal, the Fat Duck and the Hinds Head.

Royal patronage

In 2009, for a private party held during Ascot week, Blumenthal was invited to cook a meal for the Queen at Windsor Castle. The menu included baked salmon, strawberry gateau and a starter, composed to look like a bowl of fruit, that consisted of offal and sweetbreads. He was selected to provide the picnic meal for participants in Queen's Diamond Jubilee celebrations, and was a guest in the Royal Box at the Queen's Diamond Jubilee concert in June 2012.

Personal awards

In 2004, Blumenthal won the Chef Award at The Catey Awards, joining the likes of Gordon Ramsay, Phil Howard and Raymond Blanc.

In January 2006, Blumenthal was appointed an OBE in the New Years Honours List for his services to British Gastronomy.

He has been awarded honorary degrees for his scientific approach to cooking. In July 2006, Blumenthal was presented with an honorary Doctor of Science degree by Reading University in recognition of his unique scientific approach to food and long-standing relationship with the University's School of Food Biosciences. Also in July 2006, Blumenthal was the first chef to be awarded an Honorary Fellowship by the Royal Society of Chemistry. Blumenthal received an honorary Master of Science from Bristol University in 2007. In December 2013, Blumenthal was presented with an honorary Doctor of Science degree by the University of London, recognising his pioneering research and achievements in his field.

In June 2013, the College of Arms granted Blumenthal a personal coat of arms.

Chef's awards

 Best Restaurant of the Year Award – Decanter Magazine, 1998
 Chef of the Year – Good Food Guide, 2001
 AA Guide chef's chef of the year Award – AA Guide Publications 2002
 Catey Awards Restaurateur of the year Award – Caterer & Hotelkeeper Magazine 2003
 Food & Wine Personality of the Year Award – GQ Magazine, Glenfiddich Awards 2004
 GQ Magazine Chef of the Year – GQ Magazine Man of the Year awards 2004
 GQ Personality of the year – GQ Glenfiddich Awards 2007
 Chef's choice award – San Pellegrino Worlds 50 Best Restaurant Awards April 2007
 Trophy Gourmand – Austria 2010
 GQ Chef of the Year – GQ Man of the Year Awards 2010/2011
 The Diners Club® Lifetime Achievement Award 2017 at The World's 50 Best Restaurants 2017.

Television and book awards

 Best Cookbook for "Family Food: A New Approach to Cooking" – Gourmand World Cookbook Awards 2003
 Best Children Cookbook for "Family Food: A New Approach to Cooking" – Gourmand World Cookbook Awards 2004
 Best Production "Heston Blumenthal – In Search of Perfection" BBC2 – GQ Glenfiddich Awards 2007* The Guild of Food Writers Awards 2014 – Historic Heston book, Heston and his ghost writer, Pascal Cariss won the prestigious award for on British Food.
 BAFTA nomination in the Features category for "Heston Blumenthal: In Search of Perfection"- British Academy Television Awards 2008
 The Features and Lifestyle Award for Heston's Victorian Feast – The Royal Television Society Awards 2009
 Food Book of the Year for The Big Fat Duck Cookbook – Guild of Food Writers Awards 2009
 Winner of Design and Production Award for The Big Fat Duck Cookbook – British Book Industry Awards 2009
 Winner of Photography Award for The Big Fat Duck Cookbook – James Beard Foundation Awards 2009
 Winner of Design Award for The Big Fat Duck Cookbook – International Association of Culinary Professionals Awards 2009
 BAFTA nomination in the Features category for "FEAST" – British Academy Television Awards 2010

Restaurant awards
Heston's restaurants The Fat Duck and Dinner by Heston Blumenthal have received many awards, including "Best Restaurant in the World".

Personal life 
Blumenthal married his first wife Zanna in 1989, and had three children with her. From 2011 until 2015 he was in a relationship with Suzanne Pirret. 

Blumenthal said he considers himself Jewish.

Bibliography
 Family Food: A New Approach to Cooking (2005)
 In Search of Perfection (2006)
 Further Adventures in Search of Perfection (2007)
 The Fat Duck Cookbook (2008)
 Total Perfection:In Search of Total Perfection (2009)
 Heston's Fantastical Feasts (2010)
 Heston Blumenthal At Home (2011)
 Historic Heston (2013) 

As well as writing books, Blumenthal has written columns for The Guardian, T2, The Times and GQ.  Along with scientists on the faculty of Reading University, he has co-written an academic paper on the taste and flavour of tomatoes called "Differences in Glutamic Acid and 5'-Ribonucleotide Contents between Flesh and Pulp of Tomatoes and the Relationship with Umami Taste".

References

External links

 Official website of the Fat Duck restaurant
 Blumenthal's biography
 Heston Blumenthal's column in The Times
 Heston Blumenthal recipes at www.bbc.co.uk

1966 births
British cookbook writers
British restaurateurs
English chefs
English food writers
English Jews
English people of Latvian-Jewish descent
English people of Zimbabwean descent
English restaurateurs
English television chefs
Head chefs of Michelin starred restaurants
James Beard Foundation Award winners
Living people
Molecular gastronomy
Officers of the Order of the British Empire
People educated at John Hampden Grammar School
People educated at Latymer Upper School
People from Bray, Berkshire
People from High Wycombe
People from Shepherd's Bush
International Association of Culinary Professionals award winners
British gastronomes